Bluebottle can mean:

Organisms
 Blow-flies (Calliphoridae) of genus Calliphora and similar species from other genera
 Specifically, the blue bottle fly Calliphora vomitoria
 The Portuguese man o' war (Physalia utriculus), stinging marine siphonophores resembling jellyfish and known as bluebottles in Australia, South Africa and New Zealand
 Blue ant, a species of large solitary parasitic wasp
 Centaurea cyanus, the cornflower
 Graphium sarpedon, common bluebottle, or blue triangle butterfly

Other
 Blue bottle (chemical reaction) 
 The Blue Bottle Coffee House, Vienna, founded in 1686 
 Blue Bottle Coffee, roaster based in Oakland, California, US
 Bluebottle (character), in The Goon Show
 Bluebottle OS, computer operating system
 Fizzy Blue Bottles, a type of sour sweets
 A slang term for a police officer

Animal common name disambiguation pages